Oskar Potiorek (20 November 1853 – 17 December 1933) was an officer of the Austro-Hungarian Army, who served as Governor of Bosnia and Herzegovina from 1911 to 1914. He was a passenger in the car carrying Archduke Franz Ferdinand of Austria and his wife Duchess Sophie of Hohenberg when they were assassinated in Sarajevo on 28 June 1914. Potiorek had failed to inform the driver of a change of route which led the royal car to take a wrong turn, stalling after trying to turn around, and ending up in front of Gavrilo Princip. In World War I, Potiorek commanded the Austro-Hungarian forces in the failed Serbian Campaign of 1914. He was removed from command, retiring from the army shortly afterward.

Early life 
Potiorek was born in Bad Bleiberg, Carinthia, into a family of Czech origin. The Potiorek family moved from Bohemia to Carinthia before the birth of Oskar. His father, Paul Potiorek, was a mining engineer official. Potiorek attended the Imperial and Royal Military Institute of Technology and the Kriegsschule academy in Vienna. He joined the Austro-Hungarian General Staff in 1879, appointed deputy chief by Emperor Franz Joseph in 1902. However, the emperor ignored his ambitions, when in 1906 he filled the post of chief of staff with Feldmarschall-Leutnant Franz Conrad von Hötzendorf at the behest of heir presumptive and deputy commander-in-chief Archduke Franz Ferdinand. Potiorek became commanding general at Graz, Styria, in the rank of a Feldzeugmeister. Serving as inspector general in Sarajevo in 1910, he was appointed Bosnian governor (Landeschef) the next year, holding both civil and military offices.

In 1913 Potiorek invited Franz Ferdinand and his wife, Sophie, to watch his troops on maneuvers scheduled for 26 and 27 June 1914. An attack on the life of former governor Marijan Varešanin in 1910 and several rumours of future assaults (leaked by Serbian prime minister Nikola Pašić) did not keep the archduke from a public appearance in Sarajevo, backed by Potiorek, who worried about his own prestige.

Assassination of Archduke Ferdinand 

On 28 June the royal couple arrived from Ilidža by train and went to Philipovic army camp where Franz Ferdinand performed a brief review of the troops. Potiorek was waiting to take the royal party to the city hall (present-day National and University Library of Bosnia and Herzegovina) for the official reception. Franz Ferdinand, his wife and several officials switched into a six-car motorcade driving down Appel Quay along Miljacka River without further security measures. Potiorek was in the third car, a Gräf & Stift Double Phaeton, open six-seater driven by Leopold Lojka, together with the owner Count Harrach and the royal couple. At 10:10, when the vehicles passed the central police station, assassin Nedeljko Čabrinović hurled a hand grenade at the archduke's car. Lojka accelerated when he saw the object flying towards the car, the grenade bounced off the coachwork and exploded under the wheel of the next car, wounding two passengers and several spectators.

A furious Franz Ferdinand, after attending the official reception at the City Hall, asked about visiting the members of his party that had been wounded by the bomb. A member of the archduke's staff, Andreas von Morsey, according to his own accounts suggested this might be dangerous, but Potiorek replied "Do you think Sarajevo is full of assassins? I will take responsibility". Nevertheless, the governor decided that the royal car should travel on an alternative route to the Sarajevo hospital. However, he failed to tell the driver about this decision. On the way to the hospital, Lojka took a right turn opposite the Latin Bridge, where one of the conspirators, Gavrilo Princip, was standing outside the corner delicatessen at the time. The assassin had already abandoned his plans, but when he saw the driver begin to back up the car right in front of him, he stepped forward, drew his gun, and at a distance of about four or five paces, fired two shots into the car. Franz Ferdinand was hit in the neck and Sophie in the abdomen. Neither Potiorek, Count Harrach nor Leopold Lojka were injured. Princip later claimed that the bullet that killed Sophie was meant for the governor.

After Ferdinand's assassination 

Following the assassination, Potiorek organized and stimulated anti-Serb riots in Sarajevo. Potiorek reestablished an auxiliary militia, the Schutzkorps, to implement the policy of anti-Serb repression. Schutzkorps, predominantly recruited among Bosniak population, were involved in the persecution of people of Serb ethnicity particularly in Serb populated areas of eastern Bosnia. Around 5,500 ethnic Serbs were arrested in Bosnia and Herzegovina.  Between 700 and 2,200 died in prison while 460 were executed. Around 5,200 Serb families were forcibly expelled from Bosnia and Herzegovina.

Despite his responsibility, Potiorek remained in office. When the assassination and the succeeding July Crisis led to the outbreak of World War I, he became the commander of the Balkanstreitkräfte (Balkan Armed Forces). It is speculated that this "survivor's guilt" led Potiorek to take charge of the Austro-Hungarian army and lead the first mission to "punish" Serbia. He was reportedly very zealous in his actions (multiple times he claimed "I was spared at Sarajevo so that I may die avenging it!"), but was apparently an inept commander. The small Royal Serbian Army remained undefeated in all major battles and after the textbook military disasters at the Battle of Cer and the Battle of Kolubara with huge numbers of casualties, he was removed from command on 22 December 1914 and replaced by Archduke Eugen of Austria, a choice that reportedly made him suicidal.

Death and legacy

Potiorek retired to Carinthian Klagenfurt, where he died in 1933. He is buried in the cemetery of the Theresian Military Academy in Wiener Neustadt.

Honours 
 :
 Grand Cross of the Imperial Order of Leopold
 Knight of the Iron Crown, 1st Class
 Grand Cross of the Order of Franz Joseph
 Commander of the Order of Saint Stephen of Hungary
 :
 Knight of the Red Eagle, 1st Class in Diamonds
 Knight of the Prussian Crown, 2nd Class with Star
 : Knight of the Albert Order, 2nd Class
  Persian Empire: Order of the Lion and the Sun, 1st Class
 : Grand Cross of Isabella the Catholic

References 

Bibliography

Further reading 
 
 Francesco Lamendola, "La Seconda e la Terza Campagna Austro-Serba" (September–December 1914) (in Italian)
 Jeřábek, Rudolf. Potiorek: General im Schatten von Sarajevo. Graz: Verlag Styria, 1991.   (in German)

External links 
 Oskar Potiorek page at Spartacus Educational
 

1853 births
1933 deaths
People from Villach-Land
People from the Duchy of Carinthia
Governors of Bosnia and Herzegovina
Austro-Hungarian generals
Austro-Hungarian military personnel of World War I
Knights Commander of the Order of Saint Stephen of Hungary
Grand Crosses of the Order of Franz Joseph
Knights Grand Cross of the Order of Isabella the Catholic
World War I crimes by Austria-Hungary